The 1974 Columbia Lions football team was an American football team that represented Columbia University during the 1974 NCAA Division I football season. Columbia finished last in the Ivy League.

In their first season under head coach  William Campbell, the Lions compiled a 1–8 record and were outscored 258 to 81. Dick Cummings and Mike Telep were the team captains.

The Lions' winless (0–7) conference record was the worst in the Ivy League standings. Columbia was outscored 210 to 43 by Ivy opponents.

Columbia played its home games at Baker Field in Upper Manhattan, in New York City.

Schedule

References

Columbia
Columbia Lions football seasons
Columbia Lions football